David Axelrod may refer to:

 David Axelrod (musician) (1931–2017), American composer, arranger and producer
 David Axelrod (political consultant), (born 1955) senior advisor to former U.S. President Barack Obama.
 David Jason Axelrod Ha'ivri (born 1967), an Israeli settler, political activist
 David Axelrod (physician) (1935–1994), a medical doctor and New York State Commissioner of Health in the 1980s and 1990s; drafted the Libby Zion Law